Douglas County is one of the 36 counties in the U.S. state of Oregon. As of the 2020 census, the population was 111,201. The county seat is Roseburg. The county is named after Stephen A. Douglas, an American politician who supported Oregon statehood. Douglas County comprises the Roseburg, OR Micropolitan Statistical Area.

History
The area originally was inhabited by the Umpqua Indians, a grouping of natives who spoke a variety of Penutian and Athabaskan languages. Following the Rogue River Indian War in 1856, most of the remaining natives were moved by the government to the Grand Ronde Indian Reservation. However, seven families of Umpqua hid in the hills, eluding capture for many decades.  They are now federally recognized as the Cow Creek Band of Umpqua Tribe of Indians. The tribe manages a small reservation in Canyonville, Oregon, and has a Casino/Hotel named Seven Feathers to represent the seven families who refused forced removal to the Grand Ronde Reservation.

Douglas County was created on January 7, 1852, from the portion of Umpqua County which lay east of the Coast Range summit. In 1856 the Camas Valley was annexed to Douglas County from Coos County. In 1862, the rest of Umpqua county was absorbed into Douglas County, some say due to the loss of population following the end of the early gold boom, while others attribute the absorption to politics. Further boundary adjustments were made with Jackson and Lane Counties in 1915. The borders of Douglas County are largely defined by the Umpqua River watershed.

In 2017, after the defeat of a referendum, the Douglas County Library System ceased operations and all public libraries in the county were closed. Subsequently, 10 of the cities reopened their libraries to continue serving their communities.

Geography
It is the fifth-largest county in Oregon by area. A portion of the Umpqua National Forest is in Douglas County. Douglas County is one of two Oregon counties that extend from the Pacific Ocean to the Cascade Range. (The other is Lane County.)

National protected areas
 Crater Lake National Park (part)
 Rogue River-Siskiyou National Forest (part)
 Siuslaw National Forest (part)
 Umpqua National Forest (part)
 Willamette National Forest (part)

Adjacent counties
 Lane County (north)
 Klamath County (east)
 Jackson County (south)
 Josephine County (south)
 Curry County (southwest)
 Coos County (west)

Demographics

2000 census
As of the census of 2000, there were 100,399 people, 39,821 households, and 28,233 families living in the county.  The population density was 20 people per square mile (8/km2).  There were 43,284 housing units at an average density of 9 per square mile (3/km2).  The racial makeup of the county was 93.86% White, 0.18% Black or African American, 1.52% Native American, 0.63% Asian, 0.09% Pacific Islander, 1.02% from other races, and 2.70% from two or more races.  3.27% of the population were Hispanic or Latino of any race. 18.4% were of German, 13.2% American, 12.6% English and 10.2% Irish ancestry. 96.5% spoke English and 2.2% Spanish as their first language.

There were 39,821 households, out of which 29.10% had children under the age of 18 living with them, 57.2% were married couples living together, 9.6% had a female householder with no husband present, and 29.1% were non-families. 23.9% of all households were made up of individuals, and 11% had someone living alone who was 65 years of age or older.  The average household size was 2.48 and the average family size was 2.9.

In the county, the population was spread out, with 24% under the age of 18, 7.5% from 18 to 24, 24.2% from 25 to 44, 26.4% from 45 to 64, and 17.8% who were 65 years of age or older.  The median age was 41 years. For every 100 females there were 96.8 males.  For every 100 females age 18 and over, there were 94.2 males.

The median income for a household in the county was $33,223, and the median income for a family was $39,364. Males had a median income of $32,512 versus $22,349 for females. The per capita income for the county was $16,581.  About 9.6% of families and 13.1% of the population were below the poverty line, including 16.6% of those under age 18 and 9.2% of those age 65 or over.

2010 census
As of the 2010 census, there were 107,667 people, 44,581 households, and 29,839 families living in the county. The racial makeup of the county was 92.4% white, 1.8% American Indian, 1.0% Asian, 0.3% black or African American, 0.1% Pacific islander, 1.2% from other races, and 3.2% from two or more races. Those of Hispanic or Latino origin made up 4.7% of the population. In terms of ancestry, 25.6% were German, 16.7% were Irish, 15.8% were English, and 5.7% were American.

Of the 44,581 households, 26.4% had children under the age of 18 living with them, 51.2% were married couples living together, 10.8% had a female householder with no husband present, 33.1% were non-families, and 26.6% of all households were made up of individuals. The average household size was 2.38 and the average family size was 2.82. The median age was 46.1 years.

The median income for a household in the county was $39,711 and the median income for a family was $48,729. Males had a median income of $39,308 versus $28,176 for females. The per capita income for the county was $21,342. About 10.6% of families and 15.6% of the population were below the poverty line, including 24.1% of those under age 18 and 9.0% of those age 65 or over.

2020 census
As of the 2020 census, there were 111,201 people residing in the county.

Communities

Cities

Canyonville
Drain
Elkton
Glendale
Myrtle Creek
Oakland
Reedsport
Riddle
Roseburg (county seat)
Sutherlin
Winston
Yoncalla

Census-designated places

 Days Creek
 Dillard
 Fair Oaks
 Gardiner
 Glide
 Green
 Lookingglass
 Melrose
 Roseburg North
 Tri-City
 Winchester Bay

Unincorporated communities

Anlauf
Ash
Azalea
Brockway
Camas Valley
Clearwater
Cleveland
Curtin
Diamond Lake
Dixonville
Drew
Edenbower
Elkhead
Idleyld Park
Leona
Milo
Nonpareil
Peel
Rice Hill
Round Prairie
Scottsburg
Shady
Steamboat
Sulphur Springs
Tenmile
Tiller
Toketee Falls
Tyee
Umpqua
Union Gap
Wilbur
Winchester

Transportation

Roads
Oregon Route 99 runs through Azalea, Tri-City, Myrtle Creek, Canyonville, Green, Roseburg, Winchester, Sutherlin, Rice Hill, Drain, and Anlauf.

Interstate 5 provides access to the communities of Tri-City, Myrtle Creek, Canyonville, Green, Roseburg, Sutherlin, and Rice Hill.

Oregon Route 138 runs northwest from Roseburg to Elkton, Oregon, and generally east from Roseburg to its terminus at a junction with U.S. Route 97, just east of Diamond Lake and Crater Lake.

Buses
The communities of Douglas county are regionally served by U-Trans (formerly Umpqua Transit), the local bus service. In 2017, these services were significantly expanded to include locations such as Oakland, Oregon and Tenmile

Greyhound Lines provide the community of Roseburg with more distant transportation.

Airports
There are two public airports in Roseburg, Marion E. Carl Memorial Field at the north end of town and George Felt Airport to the west.

Politics
In contrast to the Willamette Valley, Douglas County is powerfully conservative and Republican, being akin to Josephine County to the south, or to Eastern Oregon. No Democratic presidential nominee has carried Douglas County since Lyndon Johnson’s landslide win in 1964: indeed the last Democrat to crack forty percent of the county’s vote was Michael Dukakis in 1988 during an election influenced by a major drought. Historically, the county, like all of Western Oregon north of the Rogue Valley, also leaned strongly Republican: before 1964 the only other Democrats to carry Douglas County had been John F. Kennedy in 1960, Franklin Delano Roosevelt in 1936 and 1932, Woodrow Wilson in 1912 and William Jennings Bryan in 1896.

Douglas County is split between the heavily Republican 2nd congressional district, represented by Cliff Bentz, and the liberal-leaning 4th district, which includes the liberal stronghold of Eugene and has been represented by Democrat Val Hoyle since 2023. Within the Oregon House of Representatives, Douglas County is split between four districts. The coastal part, including Reedsport, lies within the 9th District represented by Republican Boomer Wright. A belt from Roseburg south lies in the 4th District, which extends into Jackson and Josephine counties, is represented by Republican Christine Goodwin. The far southwest adjacent to Curry and Coos counties is within the 1st District represented by Republican David Brock Smith, and the bulk of the county, centered on the northeastern half, lies in the 2nd District represented by Republican Virgil J. Osborne.

In the Oregon State Senate, Douglas County is split between three districts. The coastal part (9th House of Representatives District) lies within the 5th Senate District represented by Republican Dick Anderson. The two southwestern State House Districts (1st and 2nd) are part of the 1st Senate District represented by Republican Dallas Heard. A portion of Douglas County also exists within the state's 2nd Senate District, represented by Republican Art Robinson.

Economy
Almost the entire watershed of the Umpqua River lies within the boundaries of Douglas County. Approximately 25–30% of the labor force is employed in the forest products industry. Agriculture, mainly field crops, orchards, and livestock (particularly sheep ranching), is also important to the economy of the county. The land of Douglas County is roughly half-publicly and half-privately owned.

The post-Prohibition wine industry in Oregon began with Richard Somer planting Hillcrest Vineyard at the south end of the Umpqua Valley in 1961. The Umpqua Valley wine appellation lies entirely within Douglas county.

Nickel has been refined at Riddle since 1954. There is a significant federal presence in the region; the Forest Service and Bureau of Land Management administer more than 50% of the county's land.

As of 2015, the top ten private employers in the county were:

Media
Douglas County News
The News-Review
The Umpqua Post

See also
National Register of Historic Places listings in Douglas County, Oregon

Notes

References

Further reading
 Stephen Dow Beckham, Land of the Umpqua: A History of Douglas County, Oregon. Roseburg, OR: Douglas County Commissioners, 1986.
 Harold Edgar Cooper, Douglas County Tales. Monmouth, OR: Harold Edgar Cooper, 1982.
 John M. Cornutt, Cow Creek Valley Memories: Riddle Pioneers Remembered in John M. Cornutt's Autobiography. Eugene, OR: Industrial Publishing Co., 1971.
 Douglas County Historical Society, Historic Douglas County, Oregon, 1982. Roseburg, OR: Douglas County Historical Society, 1982.
 Douglas County Museum, Land of Umpqua. Charleston, SC: Arcadia Pub., 2011.
 Ron Curry, Place Names and Locations in Douglas County, Oregon. Roseburg, OR: Genealogical Society of Douglas County, 2003.
 R.J. Guyler, Douglas County Chronicles: History from the Land of One Hundred Valleys. Charleston, SC: The History Press, 2013.
 Fred Reenstjerna and Jena Mitchell, "Life in Douglas County, Oregon: The Western Experience. Roseburg, OR: Douglas County Museum, 1993.
 
 Barbara Amy Breitmayer Vatter, A Forest History of Douglas County, Oregon, to 1900: A Microcosmic Study of Imperialism. New York: Garland Publishing, 1985.
 Albert G Walling, History of Southern Oregon: Comprising Jackson, Josephine, Douglas, Curry and Coos Counties.'' Portland, OR: A.G. Walling, 1884.

 
1852 establishments in Oregon Territory
Populated places established in 1852